Highway 747 is a highway in the Canadian province of Saskatchewan. It runs from Highway 11/Highway 653 near Davidson to Highway 2.

See also 
Roads in Saskatchewan
Transportation in Saskatchewan

References 

747